The Presnya is a river in Moscow (Russia) and a left tributary of the Moskva. In 1908, Presnya was led into an underground concrete tube. The Presnya gave its name to the Presnensky District of central Moscow.

References

Rivers of Moscow
Rivers of Moscow Oblast
Subterranean rivers